Chuck Berry on Stage is the first live album by Chuck Berry, released in 1963 by Chess Records. Although promoted as a live album, it is a collection of previously released studio recordings (except for 5 songs..."All Aboard", "Trick or Treat", "I Just Want To Make Love To You", "Still Got The Blues", and a previously unreleased alternate take of "Brown-Eyed Handsome Man") with overdubbed audience sounds to simulate a live recording. One track on the album labelled "Surfin' USA", is "Sweet Little Sixteen", originally released in 1958, the melody of which was used in The Beach Boys' 1963 hit "Surfin' USA". Chuck's cover of Willie Dixon's "I Just Want To Make Love To You" was later re-recorded and released on the very rare Chess LP CH60032 Chuck Berry in 1975.

Track listing
All songs composed by Chuck Berry except as noted
 "Maybellene" (Berry, Alan Freed, Russ Fratto) – 2:25
 "Memphis, Tennessee" – 2:17
 "Surfin' Steel" – 2:32
 "Rockin' on the Railroad" (Let It Rock) (Edward Anderson, pseudonym of Chuck Edward Anderson Berry) – 1:51
 "Go, Go, Go" – 3:31
 "Brown Eyed Handsome Man" (alternate take) – 1:46
 "Still Got the Blues" – 2:08
 "Surfin USA" ("Sweet Little Sixteen") – 3:13
 "Jaguar and Thunderbird" – 1:49
 "I Just Want to Make Love to You" (Willie Dixon) – 2:13
 "All Aboard" – 2:15
 "Trick or Treat" – 1:37
 "The Man and the Donkey" – 2:07

Personnel
 Chuck Berry – guitar, vocals
 Fred Below – drums
 Martha Berry – backing vocals
 Reggie Boyd – bass
 Leroy C. Davis - tenor saxophone
 Willie Dixon – bass
 Jerome Green – maracas
 Ebbie Hardy - drums
 Johnnie Johnson – piano
 Lafayette Leake – piano
 The Moonglows – backing vocals
 George Smith  – bass
 Otis Spann – piano
 Phil Thomas – drums

Chuck Berry live albums
1963 live albums
Chess Records live albums
Albums produced by Leonard Chess
Albums produced by Phil Chess